Elections for Havering London Borough Council were held on 4 May 2006.

In London council elections, the entire council is elected every four years, as opposed to some local elections where one councillor is elected every year for three of the four years. In this election, the Conservatives took control of the council after gaining 8 seats.

Summary of results

Ward results

Brooklands

Cranham

Elm Park

Emerson Park

Gooshays

Hacton

Harold Wood

Havering Park

Heaton

Hylands

Mawneys

Pettits

Rainham and Wennington

Romford Town

St Andrew's

South Hornchurch

Squirrel's Heath

Upminster

References

2006
2006 London Borough council elections